Luray is the county seat of Page County, Virginia, United States, in the Shenandoah Valley in the northern part of the Commonwealth. The population was 4,895 at the 2010 census.

The town was started by William Staige Marye in 1812, a descendant of a family native to Luray, France. The mayor of the town is Jerry Dofflemyer.

Geography
Luray is located at  (38.664097, −78.454531).

According to the United States Census Bureau, the town has a total area of 4.8 square miles (12.3 km2), of which, 4.7 square miles (12.3 km2) of it is land and 0.21% is water.

Demographics

As of the census of 2000, there were 4,871 people, 2,037 households, and 1,332 families residing in the town. The population density was 1,026.8 people per square mile (396.8/km2). There were 2,191 housing units at an average density of 461.9 per square mile (178.5/km2). The racial makeup of the town was 92.45% White, 5.52% African American, 0.25% Native American, 0.33% Asian, 0.45% from other races, and 1.01% from two or more races. Hispanic or Latino of any race were 1.35% of the population.

There were 2,037 households, out of which 27.9% had children under the age of 28 living with them, 47.8% were married couples living together, 13.5% had a female householder with no husband present, and 34.6% were non-families. 30.7% of all households were made up of individuals, and 15.7% had someone living alone who was 65 years of age or older. The average household size was 2.31 and the average family size was 2.85.

In the town, the population was spread out, with 22.1% under the age of 18, 6.7% from 18 to 24, 27.0% from 25 to 44, 23.0% from 45 to 64, and 21.3% who were 65 years of age or older. The median age was 41 years. For every 100 females there were 87.2 males. For every 100 females age 18 and over, there were 82.3 males.

The median income for a household in the town was $34,306, and the median income for a family was $39,972. Males had a median income of $30,039 versus $19,841 for females. The per capita income for the town was $16,205. About 11.3% of families and 13.1% of the population were below the poverty line, including 22.4% of those under age 18 and 9.6% of those age 65 or over.

Notable features

 Luray Caverns is located in the western part of Luray.
 Luray is the nearest town to the Thornton Gap entrance to Skyline Drive (to the east), as well as serving as the headquarters for Shenandoah National Park.
 Murder Mountain, located off Old Wagon Road in Luray, has become a destination for ghost hunters.
 The Luray Downtown Historic District is a Virginia Main Street Community and a registered National Historic District.
 It is also home to the 2010 Valley Baseball League Champion Luray Wranglers.
 One of the dominant hills in the Town of Luray is the location of the Grand Old Mimslyn Inn, a 1931 classic Southern mansion style hotel.  The hotel is a popular site for wedding receptions. First Lady Eleanor Roosevelt visited the Mimslyn during a short visit in the late 1930s and former Virginia Governor Mark Warner visited in January 2008. The site of the Mimslyn is on the former location of "Aventine Hall," the home of Peter Bouck Borst, a mid-19th century lawyer. Aventine was carefully removed to make way for the construction of the Mimslyn in the 1930s. "Aventine Hall" is now located on South Court Street (this is a private residence) in the Town of Luray, Virginia.
 The only high school in Luray is Luray High School, home of the Bulldogs.
 The town is also home to The Page News and Courier, the major newspaper for the county.
In 1893 the Blue Ridge Bank was founded, one of the oldest still functioning banks in Virginia.
 The community's proximity to the South Fork of the Shenandoah River provides recreational opportunities connected with boating, white water rafting, and fishing as well as hunting in the fall.
 The Luray Singing Tower, officially known as the Belle Brown Northcott Memorial, was erected in 1937 in memory of Colonel Theodore Clay Northcott's wife (Northcott was the owner of the Luray Caverns). The largest bell weighs 7,640 pounds and is six feet in diameter. The smallest weighs a mere 12½ pounds. Recognized as one of the country's major carillons, regularly scheduled recitals are held, free of charge, through the spring, summer and fall. The carillon is situated in a park opposite Luray Caverns.
 Archeological Site No. AU-154, Blackrock Springs Site, Jeremey's Run Site, and Paine Run Rockshelter are archaeological sites listed on the National Register of Historic Places.

 In addition to the Luray Downtown Historic District, Aventine Hall, and archaeological sites, the Heiston-Strickler House, Kanawha, Luray Norfolk and Western Passenger Station, Massanutton Heights, Mount Calvary Lutheran Church, Page County Courthouse, Abram and Sallie Printz Farm, Redwell-Isabella Furnace Historic District, Ruffner House, Skyline Drive Historic District, Isaac Spitler House, Stover House, and Wall Brook Farm are listed on the National Register of Historic Places.

Education

Public schools
Page County Public Schools serve Luray, as well as the rest of Page County.  Luray Elementary, Luray Middle, and Luray High School serve the entire town and nearby surrounding areas.  Luray Middle and High also serve northern Page County, from feeder elementary school, Springfield, located near Rileyville.

Private schools
Mount Carmel Christian Academy is just south of town limits and is a private Christian school.

Higher education
Laurel Ridge Community College (formerly Lord Fairfax Community College) has a campus in Luray which provides students with nearly all necessary classes needed to graduate from the institution.  Many students that attend the Luray Center of Laurel Ridge are from Page, southern Shenandoah, and southern Warren Counties.

Neighborhoods

Well over three quarters of the town's population lives in one of the several planned neighborhoods of Luray.  Each neighborhood serves as a landmark to the residents of Luray, often citing their neighborhoods as their residence.
 Boomfield—Located along in the southeastern part of Luray, namely the numbered streets.
 Cedar Knolls—An affluent neighborhood, located above Hilldale, but not a part of it.
 Court Street—A neighborhood of houses and streets branching off of Court Street and South Court Street Extended.
 Downtown—The downtown district along Main Street.
 Fairview—Far eastern portions of Luray, from East Luray Shopping Center eastward toward Fairview Grocery and the town line.
 Forest Hills—An affluent neighborhood located in the southwestern portion of the town.  The roads within the neighborhood have medians with trees planted in them.
 Golf Course/Oh Shenandoah!—An affluent neighborhood located along the Luray Caverns Country Club golf course.  Homes are often overly extravagant and some are not lived in full-time.
 Hawksbill Heights—A neighborhood above the Hawksbill Creek, very near Luray Middle School.
 Hilldale—An affluent neighborhood in the east-central portion of the town.
 Husdon—The subdivision between Forest Hills and the Hawksbill Creek in the southwestern portion of the town.
 Old Farms—A subdivision just outside the town limits, yet still referred to as within town limits.
 Springview—A neighborhood in the far northeastern reaches of the town limits, just across Route 211 from Old Farms.  The roads within the neighborhood have medians with trees planted in them.
 West Lu—A housing development located in western Luray.  It is near the Luray Airport and Luray Caverns.
 West Main Street / Bixler's Ferry-Known as "The Hill" to locals.  It is the group of neighborhoods located between Downtown and Luray Caverns.
 Woodland Park—A neighborhood in the northernmost reaches of the town limits and includes both sides of Route 211.  Named for the park that was once in the middle of the loop of Rosser Dr. and Stover St., which included a public pool.  A small park remains.  Across 211, there are duplexes as well as homes, and are considered to be in Woodland Park.

Notable natives and residents

 Edward Mallory "Ned" Almond (12 December 1892 – 11 June 1979) was a controversial United States Army general best known as the commander of the Army's X Corps during the Korean War.
 Floyd Baker (10 October 1916 - 17 November 2004) was a Major League Baseball infielder from 1943 to 1955.
 William Randolph Barbee (17 January 1818 – 16 June 1868) was a sculptor recognized for creating idealized, sentimental classical figures.
Andrew Russell Barbee, Jr. (9 December 1827 – 5 August 1903), brother of William Randolph Barbee, noted surgeon during the American Civil War.
Herbert Barbee (October 8, 1848 – March 22, 1936), son of William Randolph Barbee, was noted for his neoclassical sculpture; he created a monument in Luray.
 Peter Bouck Borst (23 June 1826 – 24 April 1882) was an active participant in the mid-19th century development of Page County, Virginia, serving as a lawyer, county delegate to Virginia's Secession Convention of 1861, and president of the Shenandoah Valley Railroad.
 Charles Frederick Crisp (29 January 1845 – 23 October 1896) was a United States political figure; a Democrat, he was elected as a Congressman from Georgia in 1882, and served until his death in 1896. From 1890 until his death, he was leader of the Democratic Party in the House, as either the House Minority Leader or the Speaker of the House. He was the father of Charles R. Crisp, who also served in Congress.
 Carolyn Ellis is an academic known for her innovations in autoethnography.
 Thomas Jordan (30 September 1819 – 27 November 1895) was a Confederate general and major operative in the network of Confederate spies during the American Civil War. A West Point graduate and career soldier in the armies of three nations, he fought in numerous wars and rebellions in the United States, Mexico, and Cuba. Jordan was also a newspaper editor and author.
 Donald Edward Keyhoe (20 June 1897 – 29 November 1988) was a Marine Corps naval aviator, writer of many aviation articles and stories in a variety of leading publications, and manager of the promotional tours of aviation pioneers, especially of Charles Lindbergh.
 Robert Franklin Leedy (28 July 1863 – 12 January 1924) was a lawyer, soldier, and Virginia state legislator.
 Keith McHenry (born 6 May 1957) co-founded the global movement Food Not Bombs and wrote Hungry For Peace.

Civil War

Luray is often cited as the location (as is Yager's Mill, on the north side of town, near Furnace Hill) of an engagement between Union and Confederate cavalry on September 24, 1864, though it actually took place approximately three miles north of the town, and even to the north of Yager's Mill.

Following his victory at the Battle of Fisher's Hill Union general Philip Sheridan sent approximately 6,000 troopers under Brigadier General Alfred Torbert into the Luray Valley. Torbert's men engaged approximately 1,200 Confederate cavalry under Brigadier General Williams Wickham. Despite victory in this affair, and moving toward New Market Gap following the engagement, Torbert halted his command that night on the Page County side of the Massanutten, thereby missing an opportunity to cut off Confederate General Jubal Early's retreat from Fisher's Hill. Private Philip Baybutt of the 2nd Massachusetts Cavalry received the Medal of Honor for capturing a Confederate flag during the engagement. This action was part of Sheridan's portion of the Valley Campaigns of 1864.

Aunt Betty's Story: The Narrative of Bethany Veney, A Slave Woman (the book's cover reads merely "Aunt Betty's Story") is the 1889 autobiography of Bethany Veney's life in Luray.

Climate
The climate in this area is characterized by hot, humid summers and cool winters.  According to the Köppen climate classification system, Luray has a humid subtropical climate (Cfa).

Transportation

US 211 and US 340 intersect in Luray and are the main roadways into and out of the area. US 211 Bus and US 340 Bus provide local access to downtown Luray.

References

External links

 Town website
  shenandoahvalleyweb.org
 Military Times Hall of Valor

Towns in Page County, Virginia
Towns in Virginia
County seats in Virginia
Populated places established in 1812
1812 establishments in Virginia